The City of Port Augusta is a local government area located at the northern end of Spencer Gulf in South Australia. It is centred on the town of Port Augusta. The city was the site of South Australia's main power supplier, the Port Augusta powerhouse, located on the coast of the Spencer Gulf.

History
The Port Augusta region is a natural crossroads and aborigines have been trading in the area for 40 000 years. European settlement began in the 1840s and the town grew from a pastoral service centre to a railway town with the construction of the overland telegraph line, then the commencement of the railways towards Alice Springs and Kalgoorlie.

The municipality was created as the Corporate Town of Port Augusta on 3 November 1875. A number of smaller separate municipalities were subsequently proclaimed in the Port Augusta area, including the Corporate Town of Davenport (25 August 1887), the Corporate Town of Port Augusta West (6 October 1887), and the District Council of Davenport (5 January 1888, later called Woolundunga). The municipalities in the area were amalgamated on 16 February 1933, with Port Augusta West, Davenport and part of Woolundunga being merged into a larger Port Augusta municipality. It became the City of Port Augusta with the granting of city status in late 1964.

The Port Augusta Town Hall was built to house the municipality in 1886–87. It was severely damaged by fire in 1944, rebuilt in 1946, but was vacated by the City in 1983 after the completion of the new Port Augusta Civic Centre. The former town hall subsequently fell into disuse, and was advertised for sale by the state government in June 2015 awaiting redevelopment.

Another major industry was the production of electric power, with three coal-fired power stations burning coal mined at Leigh Creek, the first of which was completed in 1954. The last of these (Northern Power Station) was shut down on 9 May 2016. Demolition and rehabilitation of the site was completed in May 2019.

Localities
The district also includes two closely neighbouring areas, one of which is a significant town. This means there are two towns in the district:

Blanche Harbor
Commissariat Point	
Davenport
Miranda	
Mundallio	
Port Augusta
Port Augusta West
Port Paterson
Saltia (part)	
Stirling North
Wami Kata
Winninowie
Woolundunga (part)

Council

The City of Port Augusta has a directly elected mayor.

Mayors of Port Augusta

See also
Port Augusta Airport
Australian Arid Lands Botanic Garden
List of parks and gardens in rural South Australia

References

External links
Official website
Page on LGASA website

Local government areas of South Australia
Far North (South Australia)
Eyre Peninsula
Port Augusta